Heims is a surname. Notable people with the surname include: 

Jessica Heims (born 1998), American Paralympics athlete
Jo Heims (1930–1978), American screenwriter

See also
Helms